Kissimmee Utility Authority was founded in 1901 and is Florida's sixth largest municipally-owned utility providing electric services to 80,000 customers in Osceola County, Florida. KUA operates and jointly owns the Cane Island Power Park and has ownership interests in other generating stations, including coal, natural gas and nuclear sources.

KUA provides billing for refuse and storm water services for the City of Kissimmee, Florida.

Hurricanes Charley, Frances and Jeanne

In 2004, KUA and its employees experienced seven of the most devastating weeks in the utility's 100-year history when three major hurricanes struck its service area. KUA was the hardest hit electric utility in Central Florida, having lost electric service to 100 percent of its customers in Hurricane Charley, 36 percent in Hurricane Frances and 59 percent in Hurricane Jeanne. KUA workers logged 16-hour days trimming trees, digging holes, setting poles, pulling wires and restoring electricity to tens of thousands of Osceola County residents.

Criticized by customers and some local government officials about communication on power restoration efforts after Hurricane Charley, KUA's board of directors called for an independent evaluation by consulting firm James Lee Witt Associates of Washington, D.C., in December. The report by the company headed by the director of the Federal Emergency Management Administration for eight years stated that KUA should improve its emergency preparedness plan and communication.

Board of directors
As of September 2022

 Ethel Urbina, chairman
 Manny Ortega, vice chairman
 Rae Hemphill, secretary
 Jeanne Van Meter, assistant secretary
 Raymond Sanchez, director
 Olga Gonzalez (Mayor of Kissimmee, ex officio member)

Executive management
 Brian Horton, President and General Manager
 Kevin E. Crawford, Vice President of Finance and Administration
 Tiffany Henderson, Director of Corporate Communications
 Jeffery S. Gray, Vice President of Information Technology
 Cindy Herrera, Vice President of Human Resources
 Arthur J. "Grant" Lacerte, Jr., General Counsel
 Larry Mattern, Vice President of Operations
 Susan C. Postans, Vice President of Customer Service

External links
 Kissimmee Utility Authority Official Website
 FY 2021 Annual Report
 2022 Hurricane Guide

Municipal electric utilities of the United States
Water companies of the United States
Kissimmee, Florida
Companies based in Florida
Energy companies established in 1901
1901 establishments in Florida